Kristin Minter is an American  actress. She is best known as Miranda in ER (1995–2003).

Life and career 
Minter portrayed Kathy Winslow in the film Cool as Ice alongside Vanilla Ice and Rachel MacLeod in three episodes of Highlander: The Series: "Homeland" (S4E1), "Deliverance" (S4E14), and "Promises" (S4E15). She has played minor roles in numerous television series, most notably on ER as Miranda "Randi" Fronczak for 72 episodes from 1995 to 2003. Minter also portrayed Nina in the body horror film Excess Flesh.

In 1990, Minter played Heather, the oldest cousin of main character Kevin McCallister (Macaulay Culkin), in Home Alone. The blockbuster family comedy, directed by Chris Columbus, is about a young boy facing two inept burglars when he is left home alone. The movie made nearly $500m worldwide. Minter was one of only three main cast members not to return in the sequel, Home Alone 2: Lost in New York, two years later.

Filmography

Film

Television

References

External links 
Official site

American film actresses
American television actresses
Living people
People from Yardley, Pennsylvania
Actresses from Pennsylvania
Actresses from Miami
21st-century American women
Year of birth missing (living people)